Benjamin Lev is a former University Trustee Professor of Decision Sciences and Management Information Systems Department at Drexel University. He has been a prolific author and has made significant contributions in Operations Research and Management Science. He has contributed to the areas of inventory control, mathematical programming, and operations planning and scheduling. He is well known for his developments of Inventory Control Models, Transportation Problems, DEA and Fuzzy Decision Analyses.

His present editorial positions include the Editor-In-Chief of OMEGA - The International Journal of Management Science and the Co-Editor-In-Chief of International Journal of Management Science and Engineering Management.

Education 
Lev received his PhD. in Operations Research from Case Western Reserve University. He has M.Sc. in Industrial Engineering and B.Sc. in Mechanical Engineering from the Technion – Israel Institute of Technology.

Academic career 
Lev is a professor and former Head of Decision Sciences Department at Drexel University, Philadelphia PA since 2009. During 1990-2009 he served as the Dean of School of Management, the Chair of Department of Management Studies, Professor and an Emeritus Professor at University of Michigan–Dearborn, MI. From 1987 to 1990 he served as the Head of The Management Department at Worcester Polytechnic Institute, Worcester MA and during 1970 to 1987 he served as the Chair of Management Department and a professor at Temple University, Philadelphia PA.

He is holding or has held a series of short faculty appointments at several universities as visiting professor, honorary professor, or adjunct professor: Wharton School (spring 1986), Tel-Aviv University (1974–75), San Jose State University (summer 1987), Tianjin University (summer 1986), Beijing Jiaotong University (2017–20), Chengdu University (2017–20), Nanjing University of Aeronautics and Astronautics (2018–20), Nanjing University of Information Science and Technology (2018–), Nanjing Audit University (2018–) and Xidian University (2019-)

Honors and awards 

 Biographical sketch in Young Scientists in Israel, pp. 148‑156, Remba, Rubin Mass, 1971.
 Intergovernmental Professional Act (IPA), Dept. of Energy, Washington, D.C., 1978.
 Trustee Professor, Drexel University, Philadelphia PA 2014-2021.

Books
Co-author and co-editor of these books:

Introduction to Mathematical Programming
Energy Models and Studies
Analytic Techniques for Energy Planning
Production Management: Methods and Studies
Strategic Planning in Energy and Natural Resources
Engineering Management
Advanced Business Analytics
Big Data Management
Data Science and Digital Business
Internet of Things: Cases and Studies
Internet of Things in Management Science and Operations Research: Implemented Studies
Sustainability: Cases and Studies

References

Living people
Drexel University faculty
Case Western Reserve University alumni
Technion – Israel Institute of Technology alumni
21st-century American writers
University of Michigan–Dearborn people
Worcester Polytechnic Institute faculty
Temple University faculty
American editors
Year of birth missing (living people)